{{Speciesbox
| status = CR
| status_system = IUCN3.1
| status_ref =  
| taxon = Enteromius carcharhinoides
| display_parents = 3
| authority = (Stiassny, 1991)
| synonyms = *'Barbus carcharhinoides Stiassny, 1991
}}Enteromius carcharhinoides is a species of ray-finned fish in the genus Enteromius''.It is only found at one location on the River Via which is part of the St. Paul's River system in Liberia.

References

Enteromius
Taxa named by Melanie Stiassny
Fish described in 1991